This is a list of the sheep breeds usually considered to have originated in Spain. Some may have complex or obscure histories, so inclusion here does not necessarily imply that a breed is predominantly or exclusively Spanish.

References

 
Sheep